Atrolysin B (Crotalus atrox metalloendopeptidase b, hemorrhagic toxin b, Ht-b) is an enzyme. This enzyme catalyses the following chemical reaction

 Cleavage of His5-Leu, His10-Leu, Ala14-Leu, Tyr16-Leu and Gly23-Phe of insulin B chain; identical to the cleavage of insulin B chain by atrolysin C. Also cleaves -Ser bonds in glucagon

This enzyme is present in the western diamondback rattlesnake (Crotalus atrox).

References

External links 
 

EC 3.4.24